Cosmosoma protus is a moth of the subfamily Arctiinae. It was described by Herbert Druce in 1894. It is found in Mexico.

References

protus
Moths described in 1894